everywoman is a membership organisation based in the United Kingdom that advocates for advancement of women in business to close the gender pay gap. It provides personal development resources, leadership training, events, award programmes, networking opportunities and inspiration for women in business and female entrepreneurs. They work closely with government, opinion formers and business support organisations, with sponsors including NatWest and Specsavers.

In November 2010, everywoman launched the Modern Muse project, designed to engage the next generation of female business leaders and entrepreneurs by showcasing women of today in all walks of business life. Its goal was to reach out to one million young women and girls to inspire them to look at business careers and entrepreneurship as a way to achieve their dreams.

Background

It was founded in September 1999 by friends Karen Gill and Maxine Benson, after they felt frustrated with the lack of resources available for women in business in the UK. Karen Gill and Maxine Benson were awarded MBEs in the New Year's Honours 2009 for their services to women's enterprise.

everywoman Awards

NatWest everywoman awards
everywoman's flagship awards programme, the NatWest everywoman awards, launched in 2003 recognises the achievements of women business owners, and in the past has rewarded high-profile women such as Elle Macpherson, Alexandra Taylor, Dame Stella Rimington and Dame Mary Perkins, founder of Specsavers.

FDM everywoman in Technology Awards were launched to demonstrate this profession holds a wealth of career opportunities for women and they will shine the spotlight on women who are enjoying successful careers.

FTA everywoman in Transport & Logistics Awards
Launched in 2008, the awards are breaking down stereotypes and creating industry role models in a traditionally a male dominated industry.

Specsavers everywoman in Retail Ambassadors Programme
seek to identify the dynamic female talent working at the top of the retail industry and showcase the broad range of career opportunities that retail can offer women, beyond the shop floor.

References

External links
 

Women's occupational organizations
Entrepreneurship
British women in business
Professional networks
Business and industry awards
Gender equality